JJ72 is the self-titled debut album by Dublin indie rock trio JJ72. It was released on August 28, 2000.

Track listing
 "October Swimmer" – 3:21
 "Undercover Angel" – 3:44
 "Oxygen" – 3:42
 "Willow" – 4:23
 "Surrender" – 4:11
 "Long Way South" – 2:51
 "Snow" – 3:20
 "Broken Down" – 5:09
 "Improv" – 2:52
 "Not Like You" – 3:36
 "Algeria" – 3:21
 "Bumble Bee" – 8:14

Personnel

JJ72
 Mark Greaney - vocals, guitar, songwriting 
 Hilary Woods - bass, vocals
 Fergal Matthews - drums, percussion

2000 albums
JJ72 albums